The 1992 United States Senate election in Idaho took place on November 3, 1992, alongside other elections to the United States Senate in other states as well as elections to the United States House of Representatives and various state and local elections. Incumbent Republican U.S. Senator Steve Symms decided to retire instead of seeking a third term. Republican nominee and Boise mayor Dirk Kempthorne won the open seat, defeating Democratic Congressman Richard H. Stallings. 

To date, Stallings' 43 percent is the last time that the Democrats have won more than 40 percent of the vote in a Senate election in Idaho.

Democratic primary

Candidates
 Richard H. Stallings, U.S. Representative
 Matt Schaffer
 David W. Sheperd

Results

Republican primary

Candidates
 Dirk Kempthorne, Mayor of Boise
 Rod Beck, former State Senator
 Milt Erhart

Results

General election

Candidates
 Dirk Kempthorne (R), Mayor of Boise
 Richard H. Stallings (D), U.S. Representative

Results

See also
 1992 United States Senate elections

References

1992 Idaho elections
Idaho
1992